Michael Chaim Nelson is a former Councilman from the New York City Council's 48th district, covering the Midwood, Sheepshead Bay, Homecrest, and Brighton Beach sections of Brooklyn.

He won the seat in 1999 after Anthony Weiner moved up to Congress to replace Chuck Schumer in the House of Representatives. Due to term limits, he left office in December 2013 and was replaced by fellow Democrat Chaim Deutsch on January 1, 2014.

References

External links
NYC Council 48

Living people
New York (state) Democrats
New York City Council members
People from Brooklyn
Year of birth missing (living people)